The Urucum worm lizard (Amphisbaena leeseri) is a species of worm lizard in the family Amphisbaenidae. The species is endemic to central South America.

Etymology
The specific name, leeseri, is in honor of Leo Leeser (1871–1942), who died in the Theresienstadt concentration camp, but whose estate funded the Leo Leeser Center for Tropical Biology.

Geographic range
A. leeseri is found in southwestern Brazil (Mato Grosso do Sul state) and in adjacent northern Paraguay.

Reproduction
A. leeseri is oviparous.

References

Further reading
Cacciali P, Scott NJ, Ortíz ALA, Fitzgerald LA, Smith P (2016). "The Reptiles of Paraguay: Literature, Distribution, and an Annotated Taxonomic Checklist". Museum of Southwestern Biology, University of New Mexico, Special Publication (11): 1–373.
Gans C (1964). "New Records of Amphisbaena sivestrii Boulenger, and the Description of a New Two-pored Species from the Northern Chaco". Copeia 1964 (3): 553–561. (Amphisbaena leeseri, new species).
Gans C (2005). "Checklist and Bibliography of the Amphisbaenia of the World". Bulletin of the American Museum of Natural History (289): 1–130. (Amphisbaena leeseri, p. 16).
Vanzolini PE (2002). "An aid to the identification of the South American species of Amphisbaena (Squamata, Amphisbaenidae)". Papéis Avulsos de Zoologia, Museu de Zoologia da Universidade de São Paulo 42 (15): 351–362.

Amphisbaena (lizard)
Reptiles described in 1964
Taxa named by Carl Gans